Åge Steen (born 11 February 1960) is a Norwegian football manager and former player.

Career
A left-back, Steen spent his playing career in Kongsvinger IL from 1982 through 1983 and 1986 through 1988, as well as lesser teams Grue IL and Kjellmyra IL.

Steen also managed Kongsvinger from 1996 through 1997, later FK Haugesund from 1999 to 2000. He was the head coach of the Norway women's national team from 2000 to 2004, including at the 2003 FIFA Women's World Cup.

References

External links
 
 
 Åge Steen at Soccerdonna.de 

1960 births
Living people
People from Hedmark
Sportspeople from Innlandet
Norwegian footballers
Association football fullbacks
Kongsvinger IL Toppfotball players
Norwegian football managers
Kongsvinger IL Toppfotball managers
FK Haugesund managers
Women's association football managers
Norway women's national football team managers
2003 FIFA Women's World Cup managers